Magitl is a rural locality (a selo) in Kosobsky Selsoviet, Tlyaratinsky District, Republic of Dagestan, Russia. The population was 20 as of 2010.

Geography 
Magitl is located 26 km north of Tlyarata (the district's administrative centre) by road. Busutli is the nearest rural locality.

References 

Rural localities in Tlyaratinsky District